Gastón Nicolás Soffritti (born December 13, 1991) is an Argentine actor. He debuted as an actor at the age of 9 and has appeared in the series Floricienta, Patito Feo, Sueña Conmigo and Graduados.

Biography
Soffritti's first work was in the telenovela Yago, pasión Morena. He was then aged 9 and was selected from 1,500 children seeking to join the cast. He played the cousin of Facundo Arana's character. Beset with acting commitments, he received his education at five different schools.

He became famous as the lead male actor of the teen drama Patito Feo. The successful telenovela lasted for two seasons.

In an attempt to escape the teen drama genre, Soffritti worked in Graduados. He received the proposal while making a short production for América 2. To design his character he had interviews with all the other actors who played roles linked with it; this included most of the cast because his character was a nexus between the two families of the plot, the firm and the school. He praised the actress Nancy Dupláa, who played his mother in the fiction.

In 2013, it was reported that he would be a member of the cast of Vecinos en guerra, a telenovela produced by Underground, along Mike Amigorena and Mónica Antonopulos. His character in the fiction was to be a young thief, a contrast to the character he played in Graduados.

Soffritti is also a guitar and drum player. He has a band named Quimera 9.

Television series

Movies

Theater

References

1991 births
Living people
Argentine male stage actors
Argentine male television actors
Male actors from Buenos Aires
Participants in Argentine reality television series
Bailando por un Sueño (Argentine TV series) participants